"If That's OK with You" is a song written by Savan Kotecha, Arnthor Birgisson and Max Martin for The X Factor winner Shayne Ward from his second studio album Breathless. It was released as his fourth single overall, a double A-side with "No U Hang Up". Although due to be released on 19 August 2007 as the first single from "Breathless", its relative underperformance on radio triggered a decision to push the single back until its eventual release with a song that received a more favourable reaction, "No U Hang Up" on 24 September.

Official versions
Moto Blanco Club Mix
Moto Blanco Radio Edit

Music video
Directed by Wayne Isham, the video shows Shayne and his friends hanging out at a pool party. The video was also a first to feature Shayne baring his chest and doing dance choreography while drenched in water.

Chart performance

On September 30, the single peaked at No. 2 in the UK Singles Chart, beaten to the top by the Sugababes's "About You Now". It has sold 150,000 copies in the UK. It reached No. 1 in the Irish Singles Chart, a separate peak from that of "No U Hang Up" due to the digital singles being released separately in the Republic of Ireland. It remained atop of the Irish chart for a total of four weeks.

In the UK, "If That's OK with You" sold 33,400 copies when it charted at No. 2 and a week later it fell to No. 3, selling 25,600 copies. The next week, it fell to No. 4 on sales of 16,000 and then fell to No. 10 with 12,000 sales. To date, it has sold 143,525 in the UK and finished 2007 as the United Kingdom's 42nd biggest seller.

Charts

Weekly charts

Year-end charts

Certifications

References

2007 singles
2007 songs
Irish Singles Chart number-one singles
Music videos directed by Wayne Isham
Number-one singles in Scotland
Shayne Ward songs
Songs written by Arnthor Birgisson
Songs written by Max Martin
Songs written by Savan Kotecha
Sony BMG singles